Optica is a monthly peer-reviewed open access scientific journal published by Optica. It covers the entire spectrum of theoretical and applied optics and photonics. It was established in July 2014. The founding editor-in-chief was Alexander Gaeta (Columbia University).

In 2020, the editor-in-chief became Prem Kumar (Northwestern University, USA), assisted by an extended team of Deputy Editors: Thomas Krauss (University of York, UK), Curtis Menyuk (University of Maryland Baltimore County, USA), Irina Novikova (College of William & Mary, USA), Nathalie Picqué (Max Planck Institute of Quantum Optics, Germany) and Eric Potma (University of California, Irvine, USA).

Abstracting and indexing 
The journal is abstracted and indexed in:
 Chemical Abstracts Service
 Current Contents/Physical, Chemical & Earth Sciences
 Science Citation Index Expanded
According to the Journal Citation Reports, the journal has a 2021 impact factor of 10.644.

References

External links 
 

Open access journals
Optics journals
Optica (society) academic journals
Publications established in 2014
Monthly journals